The 1973 Illinois Fighting Illini football team was an American football team that represented the University of Illinois in the 1973 Big Ten Conference football season. In their third year under head coach Bob Blackman, the Illini compiled a 5–6 record and finished in a four-way tie for fourth place in the Big Ten Conference.

The team's offensive leaders were quarterback Jeff Hollenbach with 916 passing yards, running back George Uremovich with 519 rushing yards, and wide receiver Garvin Roberson with 416 receiving yards. Halfback Eddie Jenkins and defensive end Octavus Morgan were selected as the team's most valuable players.

Schedule

Personnel

References

Illinois
Illinois Fighting Illini football seasons
Illinois Fighting Illini football